NCFTA may refer to:

 National Center for Traditional Arts, an art center in Taiwan
 National Cyber-Forensics and Training Alliance, a corporation in the United States